Keighley is an unincorporated community in Butler County, Kansas, United States.

History
A post office was opened in Keighley in 1880, and remained in operation until it was discontinued in 1943.

Until 1925, Keighley was a stop on the St. Louis–San Francisco Railway, east of Augusta. That changed after the first oil strike. The small trading post grew to a community of 500 people and included a grain elevator, a hardware store, hotel, lumber yard, café, post office and general store.  In 1927, Keighley District completed at a cost of $15,000 a brick school building. In 1926, a fire destroyed the lumber yard and hotel. The brick school house burned down and was replaced in 1948 by a school house of cinder block, which still stands. By 1934, the once busy roads of Keighley were again simply highways. Today, it is on U.S. Route 400 east of Leon, Kansas and west of Beaumont, Kansas.

Education
The community is served by Bluestem USD 205 public school district.

References

Further reading

External links
 Butler County maps: Current, Historic, KDOT

Unincorporated communities in Butler County, Kansas
Unincorporated communities in Kansas